Karolina Kudłacz-Gloc (born 17 January 1985) is a Polish handball player for SG BBM Bietigheim and the former  captain of the Polish national team.

Achievements
EHF European League:
Winner: 2022
Bundesliga:
Winner: 2019, 2022

International honours
Carpathian Trophy:
Winner: 2017

International career
Kudlacz played also for the Polish national team. She was second on the top scoring list at the 2006 European Women's Handball Championship, where the Polish team finished 8th. Kudlacz also participated at the 2005 World Women's Handball Championship.

Junior success
Karolina Kudłacz had great success at the European women's 19 handball championship in 2004, where she was Top Scorer with 76 goals; she was awarded the Best player of the championship, and best Left Back on the ALL Star Team.

References

External links

1985 births
Living people
Polish female handball players
People from Wąbrzeźno
Sportspeople from Kuyavian-Pomeranian Voivodeship
Expatriate handball players
Polish expatriate sportspeople in Germany
21st-century Polish women